Khuis is a village in Kgalagadi District of Botswana. It is located close to the border with South Africa. Khuis has a primary school, and the population was 897 in 2011 census.

References

Kgalagadi District
Villages in Botswana